Middle Harbour Creek, a tributary of Middle Harbour, is a youthful tide-dominated, drowned-valley estuary northwest of Sydney Harbour, in Sydney, New South Wales, Australia.

Ecology

Access along the majority of the creek is easy with tracks from (the western shore) St Ives, East Killara, East Lindfield, (eastern shore) Belrose, Davidson, Frenchs Forest and Forestville. Day walks are popular with access to the creek along several well maintained fire trails, the better-known being the Bungaroo Track, Cascades Track, and Bare Creek track. The bushland surrounding the creek is rich in bloodwoods (Eucalyptus gummifera), scribbly gums (Eucalyptus haemastoma), and the narrow-leaved stringy bark (Eucalyptus oblonga).

History
Middle Harbour Creek was first explored by Governor Arthur Phillip on an expedition from Manly Cove on 15 April 1788. The intention of the expedition was to discover food. The expedition camped on 16 April at Bungaroo, where the tidal Middle Harbour finishes and the creek begins.

Access
 Pipeline Track (St Ives) starts on near the Barra Brui Scout Hall on Hunter Avenue
 Bungaroo Track (St Ives) branches off the Pipeline Track, just after Founders Way
 Cascades Track (St Ives) runs from the corner of Acron Road and Douglas Street, St Ives or Stone Parade, Frenchs Forest. The track is a well maintained fire trail with an extremely steep cemented section and a creek crossing (from the St Ives side) at a ford before reaching the cascades, which is a beautiful cascading of water over sandstone. Until the 1970s the Cascades was a popular swimming water hole with local children. There are several sandstone caves in the area..
 Lyre Bird Track (Roseville) starts at the end of Davidson Reserve
 Two Creeks Track (Roseville) can be accessed from Babbage Road, Ormonde Road or Wellington Road (East Lindfield)
 Access track (unnamed) from the end of Koola Avenue, East Lindfield
 Bare Creek Track (Belrose) runs from close to Austlink Corporate Park on the intersection of Mona Vale Road and Forest Way Road. The trail is overgrown and often difficult to find at that location. The best way to find the track is by following the trail from the end of Wyatt Avenue around the back of Sydney East Substation to find the Heath Track which meets the Bare Creek Track after a short walk.
It is possible to follow the entire length of Middle Harbour Creek, or to do a circular bushwalk that covers the majority of its length on both sides of the creek.

Gallery

References

External links
 The Northern Beaches Mountain Biking Group (NoBMoB) have details of trails around Cascades

Creeks and canals of Sydney